Mechanicsburg may refer to:

Places
In the United States:
Mechanicsburg, Illinois
Mechanicsburg, Boone County, Indiana
Mechanicsburg, Henry County, Indiana
Mechanicsburg, Ohio, in Champaign County
Mechanicsburg, Crawford County, Ohio
Mechanicsburg, Pennsylvania
Mechanicsburg, Virginia
Mechanicsburg, West Virginia

Fiction
 Mechanicsburg, a fictional European city in the comic series Girl Genius